John Sutherland (September 11, 1910 – February 17, 2001) was an American film producer.

Sutherland voiced the adult Bambi in the 1942 film Bambi. Sutherland produced 45 films from 1945–1973. Many of his films were instructional cartoons produced for Harding College extolling the socioeconomic concept of capitalism and delivering a political message on the benefits of both corporate and individual liberty, and the drawbacks of government intervention, particularly with Make Mine Freedom and Fresh Laid Plans.

Life

Sutherland was born on September 11, 1910, in Williston, North Dakota.

Film career

Sutherland moved to Los Angeles, California, to work in the film industry. While in Los Angeles, Sutherland married Paula Winslowe on September 16, 1939, and had four children.

Sutherland and Winslowe worked with Walt Disney in the 1942 film Bambi, where she voiced the mother of his character.

Sutherland quit the film industry in 1973, and moved to Van Nuys, California.

Death

Sutherland died on February 17, 2001, in his house in Van Nuys. He was 90. He was survived by his two sons and one daughter.

Selected filmography

Live-action
 Too Many Winners (1947)
 Lady at Midnight (1948)

Animation
Destination Earth (1956)
The Most Important Person (1972-1975)
The Flying Jeep ( Daffy Ditty )	 1945 
The Cross-Eyed Bull ( Daffy Ditty )	 1945 
The Lady Said No ( Daffy Ditty )	1946 
Choo Choo Amigo ( Daffy Ditty )	1946 
Pepito's Serenade ( Daffy Ditty )	1946 
The Traitor Within ( OS )	1946 
The Fatal Kiss 	( Daffy Ditty )			(8.28.1947)
Chiquita Banana 	( Chiquita Banana  (22 – 1 minutes commercials) )			(?.?.1948)
Make Mine Freedom 	( Fun and Facts about America )			(?.?.1948)
Going Places 	( Fun and Facts about America )			(?.?.1948)
Why Play Leap Frog? 	( Fun and Facts about America )			(?.?.1949)
Meet King Joe 	( Fun and Facts about America )			(?.?.1949)
Albert in Blunderland 	( Fun and Facts about America )			(?.?.1950) a.k.a. To be an Ant 
Inside Cackle Corners 	( Fun and Facts about America )			(?.?.1951)
Fresh Laid Plans 	( Fun and Facts about America )			(?.?.1951)
Career for Two (1951)	( OS )			(?.?.1951)
It's Everybody's Business 	( OS )			(?.?.1954)
Man made Miracles	( OS )			(?.?.1954)
What Makes Us Tick 	( OS )			(?.?.1956)
A Is For Atom 	( OS )			(?.?.1956)
Destination Earth 	( OS )			(?.?.1956)
Bananas? Si, Señor! 	( Chiquita Banana )			(?.?.1956)
The Living Circle 	( Chiquita Banana )			(?.?.1956)
Breath of Life 	( OS )			(?.?.1956)
Your Safety First 	( OS )			(?.?.1956)
The Dragon´s Slayer 	( OS )			(?.?.1957)
The Littlest Giant 	( OS )			(?.?.1957)
Working Dollars 	( OS )			(?.?.1957)
Living Unlimited 	( OS )			(?.?.1957)
Rhapsody of Steel 	( OS )			(?.?.1959)
A missile Named Mac	( OS )			(1962)

References

External links

1910 births
2001 deaths
People from Williston, North Dakota
American animated film producers
Walt Disney Animation Studios people